GSK1702934A is a chemical compound which acts as an activator of the TRPC family of calcium channels, with selectivity for the TRPC3 and TRPC6 subtypes. It has been used to investigate the role of TRPC channels in heart function and regulation of blood pressure, as well as roles in the brain.

References 

Ion channel openers
Thiophenes
Piperidines
Benzimidazoles
Ketones